The 18 March Division was a rebel group part of the Free Syrian Army that is active during the Syrian Civil War. It was named after the 18 March 2011 protests in Daraa. It was created on 11 April 2013 by colonel Mohammed Khaled al-Duhni out of three units. On 18 July 2013, the Southern Tawhid Brigade, one of the affiliated groups, left the 18 March Division following internal disputes. It joined the Southern Front on 14 February 2014.

History
In April 2015, after 5 Southern Front groups unilaterally rejected all forms of cooperation with the al-Nusra Front, the 18 March Division clashed with al-Nusra in the Dar'a al-Balad district of Daraa. Conflicting reports stated that the al-Nusra Front captured a member of the Southern Tawhid Brigade and threw a grenade at the latter group's headquarters.

On 28 September 2016, one of the group's field commanders, Hosam Abazid, was assassinated in the eastern Daraa countryside. Hosam Abazid was previously a member of the al-Nusra Front, then defected to the Southern Tawhid Brigade, then to the Islamic Muthanna Movement, and re-defected back to the 18 March Division.

See also
List of armed groups in the Syrian Civil War

References

Anti-government factions of the Syrian civil war
Free Syrian Army
Military units and formations established in 2013
Military units and formations disestablished in 2018